Sir Charles Mark Palmer, 1st Baronet (3 November 1822 – 4 June 1907) was an English shipbuilder born in South Shields, County Durham, England. He was also a Liberal Party politician and Member of Parliament. His father, originally the captain of a whaler, moved in 1828 to Newcastle upon Tyne, where he owned a ship owning and ship-broking business.

Early life
At the age of 15 Charles Palmer entered a shipping business in the city. After six months, he travelled to Marseille, France, where his father had procured him a post in a large commercial house, at the same time entrusting him with the local agency of his own business. After two years' experience in Marseilles he entered his father's business in Newcastle, and in 1842 he became a partner.

His business capacity attracted the attention of a leading local colliery owner, and he was appointed manager of the Marley Hill colliery south of Gateshead, in which he became a partner in 1846. Subsequently, he was made one of the managers of the associated collieries north and south of the Tyne owned by Lord Ravensworth, Lord Wharncliffe, the Marquess of Bute and Lord Strathmore.

Emergence as an entrepreneur
Using the profits of the Marley Hill colliery, he gradually purchased the properties of his erstwhile employer, while simultaneously he greatly developed the recently established coke trade, obtaining the coke contracts for several of the large English and continental railways.

Establishment of Palmer's shipyard

About 1850 the question of coal-transport to the London market became a serious question for north country colliery proprietors.

He then purchased iron mines in Yorkshire and erected large shipbuilding yards along the Tyne at Jarrow, including blast-furnaces, steel-works, rolling-mills and engine works, all on a massive scale. The firm produced warships as well as merchant vessels, and its system of rolling armour plates, introduced in 1856, was generally adopted by other builders.

In 1865 he turned the business into Palmer's Shipbuilding and Iron Company Limited.

Military career
In 1868 Palmer raised a new unit in the Volunteer Force, the 1st Durham Engineer Volunteers at Jarrow, and he was commissioned as Lieutenant-Colonel Commandant. Later, the 1st Durham EV merged with the smaller 1st Newcastle EV as the 1st Newcastle upon Tyne and Durham EV, with Palmer as commanding officer.

Palmer retired from the Volunteers in 1888 with the rank of Colonel. The same year, the 1st Newcastle & Durham was split into three separate units: the 1st Durham Royal Engineers (Volunteers), at Jarrow, and the Tyne Division RE (V), Submarine Miners at North Shields, with Palmer as Honorary Commandant of both units, together with a new 1st Newcastle upon Tyne RE (V). Palmer's younger brother, Alfred Septimus Palmer (1834–1910), a Newcastle mining engineer who had been a major in the 1st Newcastle and Durham, became commanding officer of the third unit.

Political career

At the 1874 general election, Palmer was elected as Liberal Party Member of Parliament (MP) for North Durham, and held the seat until its abolition for the 1885 general election. He was then elected for the new Jarrow constituency, and sat for the constituency until his death in London in 1907. He had a London home in Grosvenor Square.

He was twice Mayor of Jarrow, in 1875 and again in 1902–03.

Palmer was in 1902 President of the Newcastle and Gateshead Chamber of Commerce (he probably held this position for several years).

Baronetcy
In 1886, Palmer's services in connection with the settlement of the costly dispute between British ship-owners and the Suez Canal Company (of which he was then a director) were rewarded with a baronetcy, as Sir Charles Palmer, 1st Baronet of Grinkle Park, County York.

He was lord of the manor of Hinderwell which was inherited by his widow Gertrude.

Family
Palmer married, firstly, on 29 July 1846, Jane, daughter of Ebenezer Robson of Newcastle. They had two sons:
 George Robson Palmer, later 2nd Baronet (1849–1910)
 Alfred Molyneux Palmer, later 3rd Baronet (1853–1935)
Jane Palmer died on 6 April 1865.

Palmer married, secondly, on 4 July 1867, Augusta Mary, daughter of Alfred Lambert, of Paris and Massa di Carraca, Italy. They had two further sons:
 Lt-Col Claude Bowes Palmer, CBE, Royal Army Medical Corps (Volunteers) (1868–1949)
 Capt Lionel Hugo Palmer, 3rd Bn West Yorkshire Regiment and Royal North-West Mounted Police, Canada (1870–1914)
Augusta Palmer died 2 December 1875.

Palmer married, thirdly, on 17 February 1877, Gertrude, daughter of James Montgomrey of Brentford, Middlesex. They had two children:
 Major Godfrey Mark Palmer, MP for Jarrow (1878–1933)
 Hilda Gertrude Montgomerie Palmer (1884–1946)

Sir Charles Palmer died on 4 June 1907, when he was succeeded in the baronetcy by his eldest son. Gertrude, Lady Palmer, died on 21 January 1918.

Arms

Notes

References
 
 Burke's Peerage and Baronetage (various edns).
 Maj O.M. Short, Maj H. Sherlock, Capt L.E.C.M. Perowne and Lt M.A. Fraser, The History of the Tyne Electrical Engineers, Royal Engineers, 1884–1933, 1933/Uckfield: Naval & Military, nd, .
 R.A. Westlake, Royal Engineers (Volunteers) 1859–1908, Wembley: R.A. Westlake, 1983, .

External links 

 
 Land Forces of Britain, the Empire and Commonwealth (Regiments.org)

1822 births
1907 deaths
English shipbuilders
Royal Engineers officers
Palmer, Charles Mark, 1st Baronet
Liberal Party (UK) MPs for English constituencies
UK MPs 1874–1880
UK MPs 1880–1885
UK MPs 1885–1886
UK MPs 1886–1892
UK MPs 1892–1895
UK MPs 1895–1900
UK MPs 1900–1906
UK MPs 1906–1910
People from South Shields
Businesspeople from Tyne and Wear
19th-century English businesspeople